Zagibovka is a rural locality (a village) in Polozovoskoye Rural Settlement, Bolshesosnovsky District, Perm Krai, Russia. The population was 4 as of 2010. There is 1 street.

Geography 
Zagibovka is located on the Zagibovka River, 57 km southwest of Bolshaya Sosnova (the district's administrative centre) by road. Nizhny Lyp is the nearest rural locality.

References 

Rural localities in Bolshesosnovsky District